Two Against the World, also known as One Fatal Hour, is a 1936 melodrama film directed by William C. McGann and starring Humphrey Bogart, Beverly Roberts and Linda Perry. The film is based on the 1930 play Five Star Final by Louis Weitzenkorn and is a much shorter remake of the film Five Star Final (1931), which stars Edward G. Robinson. The main setting has been moved from a newspaper to a nationwide radio network whose owner, Bertram Reynolds, hungry for larger audiences, decides "in the name of public good" to revive the memory of a twenty-year-old murder case, with tragic consequences. The cynical manager of programming, Sherry Scott (Humphrey Bogart), has a crisis of conscience when faced with the deadly results.

Plot
Abetted by his marketing manager, Mr. Banning, United Broadcasting Company owner Bertram C. Reynolds decides to sacrifice quality for more profitable sensationalism by broadcasting a serial based on the twenty-year-old "Gloria Pembrook murder case." Sherry Scott, cynical manager of programming for the radio network, promises Reynolds "the hottest play you ever heard," giving the assignment to a team that includes Dr. Leavenworth, a devious reporter with the manner of a clergyman. When Scott asks his secretary, Alma Ross, her opinion of the project, she replies, "I think you can always get people interested in the crucifixion of a woman."

Not long after a jury found that she was justified in shooting her first husband, Gloria Pembroke had a daughter, Edith, and remarried. She is now Martha Carstairs. Edith, who knows nothing, is about to marry Malcom Sims Jr, scion of a socially prominent family. The UBC announces the forthcoming series on Gloria Pembroke, alerting Martha and her devoted husband, Jim, to the threat to their family's happiness.

Isolated from family and friends since their marriage, the Carstairs desperately seek help, while the young people remain blissfully ignorant. The Carstairs mistake Leavenworth for a pastor's associate and unburden themselves. Moments after he leaves their apartment, they are horrified to hear the radio advertising "Sin Doesn't Pay by Dr. Martin Leavenworth."

Scott welcomes Leavenworth's report, and when Ross challenges him, he retorts that now he only cares about financial security. The Sims hear Leavenworth's morning broadcast and come to the Carstairs to cancel the wedding, without speaking to Malcolm. Martha calls UBC and appeals to Reynolds, who hangs up on her. In despair, she drinks poison.

Carstairs finds an ally in Dr. McGuire, their pastor, whose eloquent appeal to the Association of Broadcasters leads the chairman to promise immediate action. The Federal Communications Commission will put Reynolds and his like out of business. When Jim returns home, he finds his wife's body. He sends Edith and Malcolm to the church, promising to follow with Martha, and kills himself. Scott and Ross hear the news of the suicides in the office. Later, Malcolm's parents browbeat Edith about ending the engagement; Malcolm comes in and defies them.

Reynolds wants to cancel the series and flee to England but Banning says it is too profitable to cancel. Scott raises the specter of an FCC investigation of Reynold's muckraking. Leavenworth suggests giving Edith money, and they admit her to the office. Grief-stricken but under control, Edith demands of each of the four men, "Why did you kill my mother?" Scott answers, truthfully, "for financial reasons... to sell time on the air." Increasingly distraught, she draws a gun and shoots, wildly. Malcolm bursts in and takes her in his arms, telling her "They'll go on with their filthy broadcasts, sacrificing little people who can’t fight back," but warning the men that he will kill them if they use his name or his wife's again.

Scott tells Reynolds: "You thought up these murders and I committed them...All my life I'll see that girl standing there... I want you to wake up in the night and see your own squashy, putrid little soul... We take your money, and we do your work because we are afraid to starve... I'm not." Scott quits, taking Ross with him. The phone rings: It is the FCC. He eagerly agrees to testify, and when Reynold's "Voice of the People" broadcast begins, he throws a paperweight at the wall, smashing Reynold's portrait and the speaker behind it.

Cast
 Humphrey Bogart as Sherry Scott, in charge of programming for the entire UBC network
 Beverly Roberts as Alma Ross, Scott's secretary
 Linda Perry as Edith Carstairs, daughter of Martha and her first husband
 Carlyle Moore, Jr. as Malcolm Sims, Jr., aka Mal, Edith's fiancé (credited as Carlisle Moore Jr.)
 Henry O'Neill as Jim Carstairs, Martha's husband of 20 years
 Helen MacKellar as Martha Carstairs, formerly Gloria Pembroke (credited as Helen McKellar)
 Claire Dodd as Cora Latimer
 Hobart Cavanaugh as Tippy Mantus
 Harry Hayden as Dr. Martin Leavenworth, UBC reporter
 Robert Middlemass as Bertram C. Reynolds, owner of UBC (credited as Robert Middlemas)
 Clay Clement as Mr. Banning, UBC marketing manager
 Douglas Wood as Malcolm Sims, Sr., steel magnate
 Virginia Brissac as Marion Sims, his wife and Mal's mother
 Paula Stone as Miss Symonds
 Robert Gordon as Herman Mills (credited as Bobby Gordon)
 Frank Orth as Tommy, Bartender
 Howard C. Hickman as Dr. Maguire, pastor of the Carstairs' church (credited as Howard Hickman)
 Ferdinand Schumann-Heink as Sound Mixer (credited as Ferdinard Schumann-Heink)

Production 
According to AFI.com, the working title was The Voice of Life.

The film is much shorter than the original, running for 64 as opposed to 89 minutes. Although much of the dialogue is identical to that in Five Star Final (1931), that was a pre-code film, which ends with Edward G. Robinson's character telling his boss to “shove it up his—“, throwing the telephone through a glass door on the last word. Character names have been changed. Although the fatal tragedy remains, the promised intervention of the newly formed Federal Communications Commission adds a ray of hope for the future that is not present in Five Star Final.

Reception
The New York Times review compared the film to the original play, noting that it "lacks the sincerity of purpose that distinguished the earlier work ... The principal rôles are in capable hands."

References

External links

Two Against the World (1936) at the American Film Institute Catalog

1936 crime drama films
1936 films
American black-and-white films
American crime drama films
Remakes of American films
American films based on plays
Films about journalists
Films about radio people
Films directed by William C. McGann
Warner Bros. films
1930s English-language films
1930s American films
Films scored by Bernhard Kaun